Thiat is a former commune in the Haute-Vienne department in the Nouvelle-Aquitaine region in west-central France. On 1 January 2019, it was merged into the new commune Val-d'Oire-et-Gartempe.

Geography
The river Brame forms all of the commune's southern border, then flows into the Gartempe, which forms all of its western border.

Demographics
Inhabitants are known as Thiachons.

See also
 Communes of the Haute-Vienne department

References

Former communes of Haute-Vienne